Lanes Creek is a  long 4th order tributary of the Rocky River in south-central North Carolina that drains Union County, North Carolina, and Anson County, North Carolina.

Lanes Creek rises near Alton, North Carolina in Union County and flows southeast then turns northeast to flow through Anson County to the Rocky River.

See also
List of North Carolina rivers

References

Rivers of North Carolina
Rivers of Anson County, North Carolina
Rivers of Union County, North Carolina